Raunak Sadhwani (born 22 December 2005) is an Indian chess player and Grandmaster. A chess prodigy, he achieved the title of Grandmaster at age 13. He is the 9th youngest player in history and the 4th youngest Indian to become a Grandmaster.

Raunak was U-10 Commonwealth Champion in 2015 in New Delhi, India.

Raunak studies in Center Point School, Katol Road, Nagpur.

See also 
 Rameshbabu Praggnanandhaa
 Nihal Sarin

References

External links 
 
 
 

2005 births
Living people
Indian chess players
Chess grandmasters
People from Nagpur
Sindhi_people